Pseudoeurycea nigromaculata, commonly known as the black-spotted salamander or black-spotted false brook salamander is a species of salamander in the family Plethodontidae. These separate populations likely represent distinct species.

Description
Pseudoeurycea nigromaculata is a medium-sized plethodontid: females in the type series (collected by Hobart Muir Smith) measure  in snout–vent length. The body is blackish (lighter in younger specimens), the tail has lighter coloration, and both carry black spots that have given the species its name.

Two observed egg clutches contained 19 and 25 eggs.

Habitat and conservation
Pseudoeurycea nigromaculata is an arboreal species living in bromeliads in cloud forest. Once relatively common, it now appears to be very rare. Most of its habitat has disappeared or is severely degraded. It is protected by Mexican law under the "Special Protection" category.

References

nigromaculata
Endemic amphibians of Mexico
Fauna of the Sierra Madre de Oaxaca
EDGE species
Taxonomy articles created by Polbot
Amphibians described in 1941
Taxa named by Edward Harrison Taylor